Alexandru Doru Greab (born 26 May 1992) is a Romanian footballer who plays as a goalkeeper for Liga I club CS Mioveni. In his career, Greab played for Gaz Metan Mediaș and Concordia Chiajna.

Honours
Gaz Metan Mediaș
Liga II: 2015–16

References

External links

1992 births
Living people
Romanian footballers
Association football goalkeepers
Liga I players
Liga II players
ACF Gloria Bistrița players
CS Gaz Metan Mediaș players
CS Concordia Chiajna players
Sepsi OSK Sfântu Gheorghe players
FC Argeș Pitești players
CS Mioveni players
Sportspeople from Bistrița